In typography, the body height or point size refers to the height of the space in which a glyph is defined.

Originally, in metal typesetting, the body height or the font (or point) size was defined by the height of the lead cuboid (metal sort) on which the actual font face is moulded. The body height of a metal sort defined the point size, and was usually slightly larger than the distance between the ascender and descender  to allow additional space between the lines of text. More space might be achieved by inserting thin long pieces of lead between the lines of text (that is leading).

In digital fonts, the body is now a virtual, imaginary area, whose height still equals the point size as it did in metal type.

See also
Point (typography)
Body (typography)
En
Em
X-height
Small caps

Footnotes

Typography